The Agulhas Current is the western boundary current of the southwest Indian Ocean. It flows south along the east coast of Africa from 27°S to 40°S. It is narrow, swift and strong. It is suggested that it is the largest western boundary current in the world ocean, with an estimated net transport of 70 sverdrups (70 million cubic metres per second), as western boundary currents at comparable latitudes transport less — Brazil Current (16.2 Sv), Gulf Stream (34 Sv), Kuroshio (42 Sv).

Physical properties
The sources of the Agulhas Current are the East Madagascar Current (25 Sv), the Mozambique Current (5 Sv) and a recirculated part of the south-west Indian subgyre south of Madagascar (35 Sv). The net transport of the Agulhas Current is estimated as 100 Sv. The flow of the Agulhas Current is directed by the topography. The current follows the continental shelf from Maputo to the tip of the Agulhas Bank (250 km south of Cape Agulhas). Here the momentum of the current overcomes the vorticity balance holding the current to the topography and the current leaves the shelf.
The current reaches its maximum transport near the Agulhas Bank where it ranges between 95-136 Sv.

Agulhas meanders and Natal pulses
As the Agulhas Current flows south along the African east coast, it tends to bulge inshore frequently, a deviation from the current's normal path known as Agulhas Current meanders (ACM). These bulges are occasionally (1-7 times per year) followed by a much larger offshore bulge, known as Natal pulses (NP).
An ACM induces a strong inshore counter-current.

Large-scale cyclonic meanders known as Natal pulses are formed as the Agulhas Current reaches the continental shelf on the South African east-coast (i.e. the eastern Agulhas Bank off Natal).  As these pulses moves along the coast on the Agulhas Bank, they tend to pinch off Agulhas rings from the Agulhas Current.  Such a ring shedding can be triggered by a Natal pulse alone, but sometimes meanders on the Agulhas Return Current merge to contribute to the shedding of an Agulhas ring.

Retroflection
In the southeast Atlantic Ocean the current retroflects (turns back on itself) in the Agulhas Retroflection due to shear interactions with the strong Antarctic Circumpolar Current, also known as the "West Wind Drift" despite referring to the ocean current rather than to the surface winds.  This water becomes the Agulhas Return Current, rejoining the Indian Ocean Gyre. It is estimated that up to 85 Sv (Sv) of the net transport is returned to the Indian Ocean through the retroflection.  The remaining water is transported into the South Atlantic Gyre in the Agulhas Leakage.  Along with direct branch currents, this leakage takes place in surface water filaments, and Agulhas Eddies.

Agulhas leakage and rings

It is estimated that as much as 15 Sv of Indian Ocean water is leaked directly into the South Atlantic.  10 Sv of this is relatively warm, salty thermocline water, with the remaining 5 Sv being cold, low salinity Antarctic Intermediate Water.  Since Indian Ocean water is significantly warmer (24-26 °C) and saltier than South Atlantic water, the Agulhas Leakage is a significant source of salt and heat for the South Atlantic Gyre.  This heat flux is believed to contribute to the high rate of evaporation in the South Atlantic, a key mechanism in the Meridional Overturning Circulation. A small amount of the Agulhas Leakage joins the North Brazil Current, carrying Indian Ocean water into the North Atlantic Subtropical Gyre.  Before reaching the Caribbean Sea, this leakage gets heated up by the sun around the equator, and, when finally joining the Gulf Stream, this warm and salty water contributes to the formation of deep water in the North Atlantic.

Surface water filaments are estimated to account for up to 13% of the total salt transport from the Agulhas Current into the Benguela Current and South Atlantic Gyre.  Due to surface dissipation, these filaments are not believed to significantly contribute to inter-basin heat flux.

Where the Agulhas turns back on itself the loop of the retroflection pinches off periodically, releasing an eddy into the South Atlantic Gyre. These "Agulhas Rings" enter the flow of the Benguela Current or are advected northwestward across the South Atlantic where they join the South Equatorial Current, where they dissipate into the larger background currents.  These anticyclonic warm core rings are estimated to have a transport of 3-9 Sv each, in total injecting salt at a rate of 2.5106 kg/s and heat at a rate of 45 TW.

Paleoclimate
Since the Pleistocene, the buoyancy of the South Atlantic thermocline and the strength of the Atlantic meridional overturning circulation has been regulated by the shedding of warm, saline Agulhas Rings.  The Agulhas leakage affects the Atlantic thermocline on a decadal timescale and over centuries it can change the buoyancy of the Atlantic thermocline and therefore the formation rates of North Atlantic Deep Water (NADW).

The provenance of ocean sediments can be determined by analysing terrigenous strontium isotope ratios in deep ocean cores.  Sediments underlying the Agulhas Current and Return Current have significantly higher ratios than surrounding sediments.  Franzese et al. 2009 analysed cores in the South Atlantic deposited during the Last Glacial Maximum (LGM, 20 000 years ago), and concluded that the Agulhas leakage was significantly reduced.  The trajectory of the current was the same during the LGM and that the reduced leakage must be explained by a weaker current.  Furthermore, it can be predicted that a stronger Agulhas Current will result in a more eastward retroflection and an increased Agulhas leakage.  , however, noted that changes in temperature and salinity in the Agulhas leakage is at least partly the result of variability in the composition in the current itself and can be a poor indicator of the strength of the leakage.

Rogue waves
Some 30 larger ships were severely damaged or sunk by rogue waves along the South African east-coast between 1981 and 1991.

Agulhas Undercurrent
The undercurrent can represent as much as 40% of the Indian Ocean overturning transport.

Below  a separate layer of the undercurrent can be distinguished: the more coherent North Atlantic Deep Water (NADW) which transports an average of 2.3±3.0 Sv.  NADW rounds the southern tip of Africa after which the major part (9 Sv) flow eastward and a smaller part (2 Sv) northward through the Agulhas Undercurrent and into the Natal Valley (the basin between South Africa and the Mocambique Plateau); remnants of NADW has been observed in the Mozambique Basin and Channel.  The undercurrent is more leaky than the Agulhas above, resulting in a relatively well-mixed composition of water masses — at intermediate depth there is a mixture of Antarctic Intermediate Water and Read Sea Water.

The periodicity of the meanders and Natal pulses of the Agulhas is matched by the Agulhas Undercurrent.  More research is needed but observations seem to indicate that during a meander event the Agulhas moves first onshore, then offshore, and finally onshore again, first weakening then strengthening 10-15 Sv.  At the same time the undercurrent is first squeezed offshore and weakened when the Agulhas moves onshore, then strengthened and forced upward when the Agulhas moves offshore, and finally returns to normal.

Biological properties

Primary production
The Agulhas acts as an oceanic convergence zone.  Due to mass continuity this drives surface waters down, resulting in the upwelling of cold, nutrient rich water south of the current.  Additionally, the convergence tends to increase the concentration of plankton in and around the Agulhas.  Both of these factors result in the area being one of enhanced primary productivity as compared to the surrounding waters.  This is especially notable in the Agulhas Retroflection waters, where chlorophyll-a concentrations tend to be significantly higher than the surrounding South Indian Ocean and South Atlantic Ocean waters.

Impact of rings
Warm core rings are known to have lower primary productivity than surrounding cold waters.  Agulhas Rings are no exception, and have been observed to carry waters with low chlorophyll-a concentration water into the South Atlantic. The size of phytoplankton in Agulhas Rings tends to be smaller than in the surrounding water (around 20 µm in diameter).

Agulhas Rings have also been observed as removing larval and juvenile fish from the continental shelf.  This removal of young fish can result in a reduced anchovy catch in the Benguela system if a ring passes through the fishery.

See also

References

Notes

Sources

 
 
 
 
 
 
 
 
 
 
 
 
 
 

Currents of the Indian Ocean
Climate of Africa
Marine ecoregions
Rogue wave incidents
Temperate Southern Africa